Fried milk is a dessert of Cantonese cuisine, which originated in the Shunde District of Guangdong. The dish is golden and crisp on the outside, and soft and white on the inside, with a milky flavour. Milk is thickened with flour, cornstarch and eggs, and then covered with breadcrumbs and deep fried.

It is similar to the Spanish dessert leche frita.

References

Deep fried foods
Cantonese cuisine
Chinese desserts
Custard desserts